Begg Point is a headland forming the northeast side of the entrance to Johan Harbor, on the south coast and near the west end of South Georgia. It was surveyed by the South Georgia Survey, 1956–57, and named by the UK Antarctic Place-Names Committee for Captain Sinclair Begg, Master of the whaling transport Coronda, 1933–40; Master of the Southern Opal, 1945–46; Manager on the Southern Harvester, 1946–47; and Manager of the South Georgia Whaling Co. station at Leith Harbor, 1947–51.

References
 

Headlands of South Georgia